The Panasonic Lumix DMC-LX5, or LX5, is a high-end compact "point and shoot" camera launched by Panasonic in 2010 to succeed the LX3.

The camera is also sold by Leica under the name D-Lux 5 (which has its own exterior design and firmware implementation).

Its successor is the new Panasonic Lumix DMC-LX7 with CMOS sensor but still maintaining the same resolution (10.1MP).

Features 
The LX5 has:.
 High sensitivity 1/1.63-inch CCD (10.1 megapixels)
 24 – 90 mm (35 mm equivalent) ultra wide-angle f/2.0 - 3.3 LEICA DC VARIO-SUMMICRON lens (3.8x optical zoom)
 POWER O.I.S (optical image stabilizer)
 3.0-inch (460,000-dot) LCD
 Optional full manual operation
 HD 720p30 quality movie clips in AVCHD Lite and Motion JPEG format
 HDMI output

Accessories 
 DMW BCJ13 - Battery. Chipped to encourage OEM battery usage. Some 3rd party batteries work, but features like battery level indicator typically do not work.
 DMW-AC5 - AC adapter. Needs DMW-DCC5 to supply power to camera. Port in battery door allows connection to DMW-DCC5.
 DMW-DCC5 - DC Coupler. Replaces battery pack in the camera. Needs DMW-AC5 to work with AC power.
 DMW-LVF1 - External Live Viewfinder (Electronic)
 DMW-VF1 - External Viewfinder. Optical, static
 DMW-LWA52 - Wide Conversion Lens - Needs DMW-LA6
 DMW-LPL52 - Circular PL Filter - Needs DMW-LA6
 DMW-LND52 - Neutral Density Filter - 3 shutter stops - Needs DMW-LA6
 DMW-LMC52 - Lens protectors - Needs DMW-LA6
 DMW-LA6 - Lens adapter. Works with DMW-LW52, DMW-LND52, DMW-LPL52, DMW-LMC52
 RP-CDHM15/RM-CDHM30 - Mini-HDMI to HDMI cables. Hooks up LX5 to HDMI up to 1080i. Only for reviewing pictures/video, not for preview.

Similar cameras 
Similar high-end compact cameras ("large" sensor and lens maximum aperture) are the Olympus XZ-1, the Canon PowerShot S95 and the Nikon Coolpix P7000.

Notes

External links
 
 Lumix Official Website UK
 Lumix Official Website USA
 Lumix DMC-LX5 Photos
 Official Website Global
 LX5 Official Website Global

Panasonic Lumix cameras